Eiji Sawamura (沢村 栄治; February 1, 1917 – December 2, 1944) was a Japanese professional baseball player. A right-handed pitcher, he played in Japan for the Yomiuri Giants.

Early life

On November 20, 1934, the 17-year-old Sawamura faced a team of visiting all-star players from Major League Baseball, including Babe Ruth, Jimmie Foxx, Lou Gehrig, and Charlie Gehringer. Entering the game in the fourth inning, the high school pitcher struck out nine batters and held the Americans to a single run over five innings pitched; a home run by Gehrig in the seventh saddled Sawamura with the loss. However, he did manage to strike out Gehringer, Ruth, Gehrig, and Foxx in succession. Connie Mack, who was managing the American team, was so impressed by Sawamura's performance that he tried to sign him to a Major League contract; Sawamura refused to go, citing a reluctance to leave home.

Professional career

With the formation of the Japanese Baseball League, Sawamura joined the Yomiuri Giants in 1936 and became one of their aces. He pitched the first no-hitter in Japanese pro baseball, on September 25, 1936, as well as two others (May 1, 1937 and July 6, 1940). In 1937, he went 33-10 with a 1.38 earned run average. From 1937 to 1943, Sawamura accumulated 105 games pitched, a career record of 63-22, 554 strikeouts and a 1.74 ERA.

Personal life

In 1943, Sawamura was drafted in the Japanese Imperial Army. He was killed in battle near Yakushima when his ship was torpedoed by  near the end of World War II.

Sawamura was inducted into the Japanese Baseball Hall of Fame in 1959. The Sawamura Award (Japan's equivalent to MLB's Cy Young Award), which is given to the best pitchers in the League since 1947, is named in his honor.

Sawamura's likeness was used in an episode of The Terror: Infamy titled "Shatter Like a Pearl". A Japanese P.O.W. named Tetsuya Ota (played by Kazuya Tanabe) was being interrogated by an American-Japanese soldier. Ota told him he was a pitcher in Japan and had struck out Lou Gehrig in three pitches; "three swings and misses (outside-inside-outside)" when the Yankee came to Tokyo, Japan for an All-Star game in 1934.

See also
The Victory Season: The End of World War II and the Birth of Baseball's Golden Age

External links
Japanese Baseball Hall of Fame

Japanese baseball players
Yomiuri Giants players
Japanese military personnel killed in World War II
People from Ise, Mie
1917 births
1944 deaths
Japanese Baseball Hall of Fame inductees